José Ramos Costa, born in Valencia (1926-1995), President of Valencia CF (1976-1984).

Career
After the Ros Casares period, José Ramos Costa was elected president in January 1976. Under his presidency, the Mestalla club lived a sporting career marked by the Cup title in 1979 and the Cup Winners Cup title in 1980, although from the economic point of view, Valencia started to get into debt mainly due to the redesigning works in Mestalla so that it could be ready for the World Cup in 1982, and the acquisition and works of the "Ciudad Deportiva del Valencia CF". That economic effort proved to be an economic success in the long run, and an asset that the club is still benefiting from.

Costa, son of D. Juan Ramos Chiva, a 50-year Valencia directive, gave a new impulse to the club, culminated with Valencia's brightest period and highest trophy so far: the Cup's Winners Cup. With the start of the 76-77 season, Valencia began a completely different era. The Paraguayan Heriberto Herrera arrived in Valencia as a coach and the new players Castellanos, Diarte, Carrete, Botubot, Arias and especially Mario Kempes, the Argentine Superstar joined Valencia, among others.

Kempes is the most important footballer to have played for Valencia, due to his international successes (he was part of Argentina's team that won the World Championship in 1978) as well as to his performance with Valencia Club de Fútbol. Kempes was the top goalscorer of the Spanish League in two occasions, in the 76-77 (24 goals) and 77-78 (28 goals) seasons, top goalscorer in the World Cup that took place in his country in 1978 and key player in winning the 1979 Copa del Rey and the 1980 European Cup Winners Cup. His charisma, his free kicks and his scoring ability made an Argentine journalist baptise him with the nickname of ‘Matador’ and the whole of Mestalla would shout ‘Don’t say Kempes, say goal’ every Sunday.

A dismissed coach (Heriberto Herrera), a crack like Kempes in the team, players from Valencia who were getting better like Enrique Saura or Ricardo Arias, a good performance of the new signed up players Castellanos, Carrete and Botubot, all those were the keys of the first season of Ramos Costa as president.

The Spanish-French Marcel Domingo replaced Heriberto Herrera at the head of the season and he was in charge of returning Valencia to Europe, after a five-year period of absence. Domingo, who came from training Burgos, brought three players with him, the goalkeeper Manzanedo standing out among them.

Throughout Ramos Costa's seasons, Valencia never lacked good quality players. Other footballers who arrived within these years were Daniel Solsona and Rainer Bonhof, international German player who had been world champion in 1974. Daniel Solsona, on his side, has been one of the most technical footballers to have played in Valencia.

The 78-79 season stood out for the performance in the cup competitions. The competition was not easy. The team managed by Pasieguito, who had replaced Domingo, had to test out against Barça. The outward match had an illuminating result: Barcelona 4 - Valencia 1. The qualifying round seemed sentenced and few people believed in the Valencian recovery. But in the match played in Mestalla, Valencia turned the qualifying round completely and beat the blaugrana team 4-0, result that allowed Valencia to continue in the Cup  and go all the way to the final.

After Barça, the rivals came from the Second Division, and Valencia comfortably beat Alavés as well as Valladolid. They arrived into the final to face Real Madrid. The setting was in the Vicente Calderón. In the terraces, 25,000 Valencian supporters waved the Valencian flag the senyeras in the Spanish capital, celebrating one of the best victories in the history of the club. Valencia, who played with the senyera kit, was formed by Manzanedo, Carrete, Arias, Botubot, Cerveró, Bonhof, Castellanos, Solsona, Saura, Kempes and Darío Felman and Tendillo took part as well. Valencia won 2-0, both goals by the Argentine star of the “Che” team. Together with Kempes, the most outstanding man in that final was Arias.

The celebration in the town of Turia was complete. But it would still be bigger the following season, again in a European competition. After the King's Cup title, Valencia played the European Cup Winners Cup. Pasieguito was again the technical secretary and Alfredo di Stéfano was again in charge of the winning in Europe. Thanks to the European title, the League and the Cup that stood in the background, the 79-80 season was one of the most successful seasons for Valencia. The Mestalla team had to beat quality rivals such Copenhagen, Glasgow Rangers, Barcelona, the French team Nantes and in the final the Londoners' Arsenal.

Around 7,000 Valencian people went to Brussels to attend the European final opposite the gunners from Arsenal, who were lower than the English supporters present at the Heysel stadium. The team was composed by Pereira, Carrete, Arias, Tendillo, Botubot, Solsona, Bonhof, Subirats, Saura, Kempes and Pablo. Already in the extra time, Castellanos replaced Subirats. The team was modest and with a lot of tension. After 120 minutes of play and with 0-0 the score, the final had to be solved by penalties. It was the turn for Valencia and for Kempes, who missed the first penalty. The things did not start right. But Ian Brady, also missed his. The following eight in a row were scored (Solsona, Pablo, Castellanos and Bonhof scored for Valencia) and gave way to a sudden death. Ricardo Arias beat Pat Jennings and Pereira became the hero of the final when he stopped Rix's penalty. Euphoria erupted and Saura was in charge of picking up the European Cup Winners' Cup.

The 1980-81 season started off with the European Super Cup. No Spanish team up until that year had won this competition, that brings the winner of the European Cup and the winner of the Cup Winners' Cup.

Valencia's rival was an old acquaintance, Nottingham Forest, current European and Super Cup champions and a team with great potential. The competition was played on two legs. The English won the first leg, in the mythical City Ground, 2-1, the Valencian goal being scored by the Argentine Felman. Everything was still to be decided at the Luis Casanova. Valencia played with Sempere, Cerveró, Botubot, Arias, Tendillo, Castellanos, Saura, Solsona, Morena, Kempes and Felman. The Uruguayan Fernando Morena scored the only goal of the match and the double value of the away goal scored at the City Ground gave Valencia their first European Super Cup title.

As far as the League was concerned, in that season Valencia had a chance of winning the championship, although they did not manage to pull it off. They were fourth in the table, three points behind the leaders: Real Sociedad. One of the reasons for the average performance in the final stage of the league season played by Valencia was the departure of two of the stars of the team, Mario Alberto Kempes and Fernando Morena, who returned to their countries of origin in order to play in River Plate and in Peñarol respectively.

From that point, the social and sporting situation of Valencia Club Fútbol started to get worse. The celebration of the World Cup in Spain was a large financial burden for the club, since the upgrading work on the stadium was borne by the club. In the 81-82 season, Valencia had a secondary role and ended up in fifth position in the league. After Kempes and Morena's departure, a great player entered the team, the Danish Frank Arnesen, who was only able to put in a good performance in the first year, since injuries kept him away from the field of play for a long time. A young footballer from Betxí, who would become a symbol of his time also made his debut that year: Roberto Fernández.

In the following season (1982-83), the disaster that was on its way started to be visible. The economic situation was getting worse. With Miljan Miljanic as coach, the only joys of the season were the victory in Mestalla against Diego Maradona's Barça, Kempes's return to the team after his short stay in River and the elimination of Manchester United, Banik Ostrava and Spartak Moscú in the UEFA Cup. The rest were nothing but problems and anxiety. With only seven left to play before the end of the season and Valencia was in a desperate situation in the table, Koldo Aguirre replaced Miljanic, who had been dismissed after losing 5-2 in Sarriá.

Valencia had to win the last match of the season and wait for the results of its rivals in order to avoid relegation to the Second Division and continue in the first division. In Mestalla, Valencia had to play Real Madrid, who was risking their League title. Valencia won 1-0, with a goal scored by Tendillo. The other results of that round of matches were also favourable for them: Atlético beat Racing Santander in Madrid and Celta Vigo lost in Valladolid, both by 3-1, whilst Las Palmas was beaten 1-5 at the San Mames by Athletic Bilbao, who became champions of La Liga. Valencia had amazingly survived relegation.

The following season (83-84) Ramos Costa left the presidency, which was now taken by the cardiologist Vicente Tormo.

References

1926 births
1989 deaths
Valencia CF